The Trentino-Alto Adige/Südtirol regional election of 1993 took place on 21 November 1993.

The South Tyrolean People's Party (SVP) and Christian Democracy (DC) resulted the two most voted parties at the regional level. However, while the SVP retained its outright majority in South Tyrol, the DC was the real loser of the election. The party, severely damaged by the Tangentopoli scandals, lost half of its share of vote both in South Tyrol and the Trentino, where it lost many votes to the Trentino Tyrolean Autonomist Party (PATT) and Lega Nord Trentino (LNT). The Council was divided in a lot of micro-parties.

After the election, the SVP, DC and the PATT formed a coalition at the regional level. Luis Durnwalder (SVP) was confirmed President of South Tyrol, while Carlo Andreotti (PATT) became President of the Trentino. It was the first time that the Province was not led by a Christian Democrat.

Results

Regional Council

Source: Trentino-Alto Adige/Südtirol Region

Province of Trento

Source: Trentino-Alto Adige/Südtirol Region

Province of Bolzano

Source: Trentino-Alto Adige/Südtirol Region 

1993 elections in Italy
Elections in Trentino-Alto Adige/Südtirol